Nayakudu Vinayakudu is a 1980 Telugu-language comedy film, produced by A. V. Subba Rao under the Prasad Art Productions banner and directed by K. Pratyagatma. It stars Akkineni Nageswara Rao and Jayalalitha, with music composed by T. Chalapathi Rao. Notably, this movie marked Jayalalithaa's last proper film in her acting career as it got released just a few weeks after her last Tamil film, Nadhiyai Thedi Vandha Kadal. It was the last film for which the actress-politician had worked as a lead heroine before entering official politics; and also her last film in Telugu as well. This was the last film directed by K. Pratyagatma at the age of 60 before retirement.

Plot
Chiranjeevi (Akkineni Nageswara Rao) a Ph.D. scholar & student union leader loves a charming girl Vasantha (Jayalalitha), daughter of Municipal Chairman Vinayaka Rao (Rao Gopal Rao). Vinayaka Rao is a deceitful person who perpetrates anti-social activities in the veil of social welfare and illicitly siphons off the public. Chiranjeevi always opposes his misdeeds, keeping the grudge in mind, Vinayaka Rao grabs Chiranjeevi's brother-in-law Shekar (Lakshmikanth) into his clutches, makes him to desert his wife and compels to get Rs.50,000 for his business. Here helpless, Chiranjeevi decides to sell their ancestors property. During that process, he stays a night at an old building where he acquires magical statuette which grants any wish. Through it, Chiranjeevi effectuates so many wonders and makes fun of Vinayaka Rao. Soon, he realizes all this was his dream and returns. By the time, Shekar is defrauded by Vinayaka Rao, realizes his mistake and pleads pardon from Chiranjeevi. At the point in time, Municipal elections are declared when Chiranjeevi contests against Vinayaka Rao and overthrows him. At last, Chiranjeevi ceases Vinayaka Rao's criminal acts, retain a semblance of order and peace in the society. Finally, the movie ends on a happy note with the marriage of Chiranjeevi & Vasantha.

Cast
Akkineni Nageshwara Rao as Chiranjeevi 
Jayalalithaa as Vasantha 
Rao Gopal Rao as Vinayaka Rao 
P. L. Narayana as Viswasam
Saradhi as Hanumanthu
Sakshi Ranga Rao as Panthulu
Lakshmikanth as Shekar
Jaya Bhaskar as Shankaram
Vankala Satyanarayana as Janaki Ramudu 
Arjaa Jannardhan Rao as Mallaiah
Manju Bhargavi as Sivaranjani
Roja Ramani as Madhumathi
Pushpalata as Chiranjeevi's mother

Crew
Art: G. V. Subba Rao
Choreography: Pasumarthi, Sampath, Saleem
Story - Dialogues: C. S. Rao
Lyrics: Acharya Aatreya, C. Narayana Reddy, Kosaraju
Playback: S. P. Balasubrahmanyam, S. Janaki, P. Susheela, Madhapeddi Ramesh, Vijayalakshmi Sarma
Music: T. Chalapathi Rao
Editing: J. Krishna Swamy, Balu
Cinematography: P. S. Selvaraj
Producer: A. V. Subba Rao
Screenplay - Director: K. Pratyagatma
Banner: Prasad Art Productions
Release Date: 1 February 1980

Soundtrack

Music composed by T. Chalapathi Rao.

References

External links

1980 films
1980s Telugu-language films
Indian drama films
Films scored by T. Chalapathi Rao
Films directed by Kotayya Pratyagatma